Microvirga aerilata  is a bacterium from the genus of Microvirga which has been isolated from air in Suwon in Korea.

References

Further reading

External links
Type strain of Microvirga aerilata at BacDive -  the Bacterial Diversity Metadatabase

Hyphomicrobiales
Bacteria described in 2010